Norville is a suburb of Bundaberg in the Bundaberg Region, Queensland, Australia. In the  Norville had a population of 2,409 people.

History 
St Anne's Anglican church was dedicated on 27 July 1965 by Reverend A.L. Gillespie. Its closure on 17 February 2007 was approved by Assistant Bishop Holland.

Bundaberg Special School opened on 27 January 1970.

Norville State School opened on 25 January 1971.

In 2010, eight secondary schools in the Bundaberg area along with Bundaberg TAFE College worked together to establish the Bundaberg Regional Trade Training Centre to provide advanced facilities for trade training for students of those schools.

In the  Norville had a population of 2,409 people.

Education 
Norville State School is a government primary (Early Childhood-6) school for boys and girls at Dr Mays Road. In 2018, the school had an enrolment of 656 students with 58 teachers (53 full-time equivalent) and 38 non-teaching staff (23 full-time equivalent). It includes a special education program.

Bundaberg Special School is a special primary and secondary (Prep-12) school for boys and girls at Dr Mays Road. In 2018, the school had an enrolment of 113 students with 36 teachers (32 full-time equivalent) and 49 non-teaching staff (31 full-time equivalent).

Bundaberg Regional Trade Training Centre is a secondary (9-12) specialised education unit at 118 Walker Street providing trade training skills to a number of local secondary schools.

References 

Bundaberg Region